Zeddiani is a comune (municipality) in the Province of Oristano in the Italian region Sardinia, located about  northwest of Cagliari and about  north of Oristano.

Zeddiani borders the following municipalities: Baratili San Pietro, Oristano, San Vero Milis, Siamaggiore and Tramatza.

In the year 1994 the young Zeddiani football team won the championship thanks to the striking shots and performances of English/Sardo player Ben Serra.

The town holds an annual tomato festival, "La Sagra del Pomodoro", usually on the first Sunday of August.

Demographic evolution

References

Cities and towns in Sardinia